Grande Prairie Public School District (GPPSD) is a school division in Grande Prairie, Alberta, Canada since 1911. The GPPSD is responsible for delivering the Alberta provincial curriculum, as directed by the provincial ministry of education, Alberta Education, to over 8,400 students (preschool to grade 12) in eighteen schools. The division provides preschool, French immersion, Montessori, Christian education, sports-focused, and International Baccalaureate programs.

Trustees
The 2017-2021 Board of Trustees, elected in the last municipal election in 2017, are:

Board Chair: John Lehners

Board Vice chair: Joan Nellis

Trustees: Andre Ouellette, Lesley Craig, Lynn Driedger, Paulette Kurylo, Rob Martin

Schools
The Grande Prairie Public School Division is composed of 18 schools. As the City of Grande Prairie continues to grow, the Grande Prairie Public School has been growing along with it.

Attendance at GPPSD schools is determined by geographical attendance boundaries for all neighbourhood schools. Attendance at specialized Schools of Choice is open to students who reside anywhere in the City.

Schools of Choice 

 French Immersion
 Montessori
 Christian Education

References

External links
 
 Grande Prairie Public School Division official website
 GPPSD Board of Trustees

School districts in Alberta
Grande Prairie